Ringelmann is a surname of:

 Helmut Ringelmann (1926–2011), German film and television producer
 Max Ringelmann (1861–1931), French professor of agricultural engineering

See also